The following is a List of current AFL team squads for the 2022 AFL season.

Adelaide Football Club

Brisbane Lions

Carlton Football Club

Collingwood Football Club

Essendon Football Club

Fremantle Football Club

Geelong Football Club

Gold Coast Suns

Greater Western Sydney Giants

Hawthorn Football Club

Melbourne Football Club

North Melbourne Football Club

Port Adelaide Football Club

Richmond Football Club

St Kilda Football Club

Sydney Swans

West Coast Eagles

Western Bulldogs

See also

List of current AFL Women's team squads
List of current Australian Football League coaches
Wikipedia listing of Australian rules footballer related lists

References

 
Current
AFL